Salamat Dok was a Philippine medical television program Originally hosted by Cheryl Cosim and it aired on ABS-CBN from April 24, 2004 to March 15, 2020, replacing Magandang Umaga, Bayan Weekend. The program which provides information on diseases and medical concerns. The show also provides free on-air consultation with guest physicians. The program also conducts regular free medical/dental missions within the ABS-CBN complex in the Philippines. Bernadette Sembrano and Alvin Elchico served as the final hosts.

History
The program premiered on April 24, 2004 with Cheryl Cosim as its host alongside ABS-CBN reporter Pier Pastor as one of its segment hosts. It won several awards from prestigious award-giving bodies like the Anak TV Seal in 2006 and 2007, KBP Golden Dove in 2007 and the USTv Students' Choice 2008 as Best Public Service program. It celebrated its 4th anniversary with their anniversary episodes, which featured recent scandals and controversies that rocked the medical community.

In March 2010, Bernadette Sembrano permanently replaced Cheryl Cosim, who had moved to TV5. This rivalry is due to GMA launch its own program, Pinoy MD.

In August 2011, Alvin Elchico joins Sembrano as the new host of the show.

Veteran news personality and celebrity mom, Jing Castañeda, also joined the team as Program Host in December 2012, taking care of family issues/health, as well as the show's medical missions and healthy cooking segment.

On March 30, 2019, it aired its final episode on Saturday to give way for the 2 News and Current Affairs programs of ABS-CBN, namely: Mission Possible and My Puhunan.

From March 22 to June 21, 2020 the program temporarily suspended airings due to the enhanced community quarantine in Luzon amid the COVID-19 pandemic, it was
temporarily replaced by the live simulcast of ABS-CBN News Channel (ANC)'s coverage on the enhanced community quarantine as provisional programming on its timeslot until the temporary closure of ABS-CBN because of the cease and desist order of the National Telecommunications Commission (NTC), following the expiration of the network's 25-year franchise granted in 1995.

Hosts

Final hosts
Bernadette Sembrano (2010–2020)
Alvin Elchico (2011–2020)
Jing Castaneda (2012–2020)

Final Segment hosts
Pier Pastor (2004–2020)
Bryan Termulo (2016–2020)

Former hosts
Cheryl Cosim (2004–2010)
Sol Aragones (2011–2012)

Awards and nominations
6th UPLB Gandingan Awards Best Public Service Program Host (2012)
7th USTv Students’ Choice Awards  Awards Best Public Service Program (2011)
Winner, Best Public Service Program: 8th Gawad Tanglaw (2010)
Winner, Best TV Public Affairs Program (2010) 19th Golden Dove Award
Winner, Best TV Public Affairs Program (2009) 18th Golden Dove Award
Winner, Best Public Service Program: 7th Gawad Tanglaw (2009)
5th USTv Students’ Choice Awards  Awards Best Public Service Program (2009)
Winner, Best TV Public Affairs Program (2008) 17th Golden Dove Award
Winner, Best TV Public Affairs Program (2008) 16th Golden Dove Award

See also
List of programs broadcast by ABS-CBN

References

External links

ABS-CBN News and Current Affairs shows
ABS-CBN original programming
Live television series
Philippine medical television series
2004 Philippine television series debuts
2020 Philippine television series endings
Filipino-language television shows
Television productions suspended due to the COVID-19 pandemic